David Morgan Adams (23 February 1875 – 19 May 1942) was a British Labour Party politician.

He was the son of David Morgan Adams of Ystradowen, near Cowbridge, Glamorgan in South Wales and Bessie Dent of Poplar in the East End of London. He received elementary education in the local school in Ystradowen before entering employment in a coalmine as a teenager. He later joined the Merchant Navy as an able seaman, subsequently working on the light ships maintained by Trinity House.

By 1913 he was resident in Poplar, and was elected to the local board of guardians. With the outbreak of the First World War in 1914 he enlisted in the Welsh Regiment, and spent most of the war in India.

After the war he was employed in the docks by the Port of London Authority and was an official in the Transport and General Workers Union. In 1919 he was elected as a Labour Party member of Poplar Borough Council, later becoming an alderman and was mayor of Poplar in 1934 – 1935. He was a member of the Metropolitan Asylums Board from 1928 – 1930.

In April 1930 he was elected unopposed to fill a vacancy on the London County Council, representing Poplar South. He subsequently held the seat at elections in 1931 and 1934, retiring from the council in 1937.
   
When a general election was called in October 1931, the sitting Labour Party Member of Parliament for Poplar South, Samuel March, decided to retire, and Adams was chosen by the Labour Party to defend the seat. He won the seat in a straight fight with Herbert L M Jones of the Liberal Party. At the next election in November 1935 he increased his majority, this time over Diana Spearman of the Conservative Party.

Adams died in Ilford, Essex in May 1942 aged 67.

References

External links 
 

1875 births
1942 deaths
UK MPs 1931–1935
UK MPs 1935–1945
Labour Party (UK) MPs for English constituencies
Members of London County Council
Members of Poplar Metropolitan Borough Council
Mayors of places in Greater London
Transport and General Workers' Union-sponsored MPs